The 2014 Chinese Grand Prix (formally the 2014 Formula 1 UBS Chinese Grand Prix) was a Formula One motor race that was held on 20 April 2014 at the Shanghai International Circuit, Shanghai, China. The race was the fourth round of the 2014 Formula One season, and marked the eleventh time that the Chinese Grand Prix was held as a round for the Formula One World Championship.

Lewis Hamilton won the race comfortably after starting from pole position, leading from start to finish driving for the Mercedes team. Nico Rosberg finished second in the other Mercedes with Fernando Alonso third in a Ferrari. Although contested over 56 laps, the race result was declared after 54 laps, as the chequered flag was shown one lap early through a marshalling error. The leading positions were not affected by this error.	

As a consequence of the race, Rosberg's lead in the Drivers' Championship was reduced to four points, with Alonso a further thirty-four behind. In the World Constructors Championship, Red Bull Racing passed Force India for second position, ninety-six points behind Mercedes.

Report

Background
Heading into the fourth round of the season, Mercedes driver Nico Rosberg was leading the Drivers' Championship with 61 points; Rosberg's teammate Lewis Hamilton was second on 50 points, 11 points behind Rosberg. Behind Rosberg and Hamilton in the Drivers' Championship, Nico Hülkenberg was third on 28 points, with Fernando Alonso and Jenson Button on 26 and 23 points respectively. In the Constructors Championship, Mercedes were leading with 111 points and Force India were second on 44 points, with McLaren third on 43 points.

Prior to the race weekend, Stefano Domenicali resigned from position as Ferrari team principal citing the team's poor start to the season and their longest winless streak for 18 years. Domenicali was replaced by the President and CEO of Ferrari North America Marco Mattiacci.

Like the 2013 Chinese Grand Prix, tyre supplier Pirelli brought its white-banded medium compound tyre as the harder "prime" tyre and the yellow-banded soft compound tyre as the softer "option" tyre.

Practice and qualifying
Three practice sessions were held before the race; the first on Friday morning and the second on Friday afternoon. Both sessions lasted one and a half hours. The third session was held on Saturday morning and lasted an hour.

The qualifying session held on Saturday afternoon was split into three parts. The first part ran for 18 minutes and eliminated the cars from qualifying that finished the session 16th or lower. The second part of qualifying lasted 15 minutes and eliminated cars that finished in positions 11 to 16. The final part of qualifying determined the positions from first to tenth, and decided pole position.

Qualifying took place under wet conditions, with all drivers using either intermediate or full wet tyres. Hamilton clinched his third pole position for the season, with a time of 1:53.860. As a result, Hamilton became the British driver with the highest number of pole positions, surpassing Jim Clark's record of 33. He was joined on the front row of the grid by Riccardo with Vettel qualifying third. Rosberg qualified fourth, 1.2 seconds behind Hamilton and Alonso qualified fifth. Massa, Bottas, Hulkenberg, Jean-Éric Vergne and Romain Grosjean rounded out the top ten. Räikkönen only managed 11th — missing out on the top ten for the second time in  having struggled with the balance and handling of his car during the session. Jenson Button was the best placed McLaren in 12th, ahead of Daniil Kvyat, Adrian Sutil, Button's teammate Kevin Magnussen, with Sergio Pérez qualifying 16th. Esteban Gutiérrez was 17th, with the rest of the field consisting of the Caterham and Marussia cars. Lotus driver Pastor Maldonado did not take part in the qualifying sessions, but was allowed to start the race.

Race
The race was raced over 56 laps, however the chequered flag was shown to Lewis Hamilton at end of lap 55 by mistake. According to Article 43.2 of the FIA Sporting Regulations this meant that the race officially finished at the end of lap 54. This meant that Kamui Kobayashi's overtake of Jules Bianchi on the final lap did not stand.

Post-race
As a consequence of the race, Hamilton reduced Rosberg's lead over him in the Drivers' Championship to four points. Alonso moved up to third position passing Hülkenberg with Vettel maintaining fifth place and Ricciardo moved from 10th to 6th. In the Constructors' Championship, Mercedes increased their lead, with Red Bull jumping ahead of Force India for second position and Ferrari moving to fourth, ahead of McLaren who fell from third to fifth position.

Classification

Qualifying

Notes
  — Pastor Maldonado failed to set a lap time within 107% of the fastest lap time set by Lewis Hamilton in Q1. He was later given permission to start by race stewards.

Race

Championship standings after the race

Drivers' Championship standings

Constructors' Championship standings

 Note: Only the top five positions are included for both sets of standings.

References

External links

Chinese
Grand Prix
Chinese Grand Prix
Grand Prix